The Secretary of Housing of Puerto Rico is responsible for homeownership, affordable housing, and community assistance programs in Puerto Rico.

List of Secretaries of Housing
 2009–2012: Miguel Hernández Vivoni
 2013–2014: Rubén Ríos Pagán
 2014–2016: Alberto Lastra Power
 2017–2020: Fernando Gil-Enseñat
 2020: Luis C. Fernández Trinchet
 2021–Present: William Rodríguez Rodríguez

References

Council of Secretaries of Puerto Rico
Department of Housing of Puerto Rico